K-19 is a  state highway in the U.S. state of Kansas. From U.S. Route 50 (US-50) to K-19 Spur it is signed as north–south and from K-19 Spur to US-281 it is signed as east–west. K-19's southern terminus is at US-50 in Belpre, and the eastern terminus is at US-281 east of Seward.

Before state highways were numbered in Kansas, there were auto trails. The southern terminus follows the former New Santa Fe Trail. The northern terminus of K-19 Spur follows the former National Old Trails Road and Old Santa Fe Trail. K-19 was first designated in 1926, and at that time started in Belpre and ended in Larned. Then between 1931 and 1932, K-19 was extended east, from south of Larned, along the former K-37 designation to K-8, now US-281.

Route description
K-19 runs north–south for its first , and east–west for its final . The first leg begins at US-50 in Belpre and near the Arkansas River south of Larned, K-19 turns east for its second leg, bypassing both Radium and Seward to the south before ending at US-281.

K-19 begins at US-50 in Belpre and shortly crosses an Amtrak track then leaves Belpre. It then continues northward for  through flat rural farmlands before entering into Pawnee County. From there it continues northward for roughly  then reaches the terminus of K-19 Spur. At this point it is redesignated as an east–west route. K-19 Spur crosses the Arkansas River and ends about  later at US-56 in Larned.

From K-19 Spur, K-19 travels eastward for about  before crossing Pickle Creek again. From there it continues eastward for roughly another  and crosses into Stafford County, traveling south of Radium  after crossing the county line. After roughly another  it reaches the terminus of the former K-219, a  spur that served Seward until it was decommissioned in 2013. It then continues another  and reaches its eastern terminus at US-281.

The Kansas Department of Transportation (KDOT) tracks the traffic levels on its highways, and in 2017, they determined that on average the traffic varied from 540 vehicles per day at the terminus of former K-219 to 1390 vehicles per day slightly south of the terminus of K-19 Spur. K-19 is not included in the National Highway System. The National Highway System is a system of highways important to the nation's defense, economy, and mobility. K-19 does connect to the National Highway System at each terminus, US-50 and US-281, as well as to US-56 via K-19 Spur.

History
Prior to the formation of the Kansas state highway system, there were auto trails, which were an informal network of marked routes that existed in the United States and Canada in the early part of the 20th century. The southern terminus follows the former New Santa Fe Trail. The northern terminus of K-19 Spur follows the former National Old Trails Road and Old Santa Fe Trail.

K-19 was first designated as a state highway in 1926, and at that time ran from US-250 in Belpre northward to K-37 by Larned. Also at that time the segment from K-19 Spur eastward to then K-8 was designated as K-37. By 1927, US-250 was renumbered to US-50S. Between 1931 and 1932, the K-37 designation was removed and K-19 was extended along its old alignment to K-8 which later became US-281. In 1956, K-19 was extended  southward in Edwards County when US-50, at the time US-50S, was slightly realigned within Belpre. In Pawnee County, K-19 was slightly realigned just south of K-19 Spur to eliminate some sharp 
curves. The right of way for this relocation from Zook to K-19 Spur was purchased in Spring of 1959. In 1958, the Larned Chamber of Commerce proposed to extend K-19 east  to a junction with K-14 and K-96. This was never implemented.

In Stafford County, K-19 originally turned north on present day Radium Road towards Radium, then followed NW 150th Street east to end at US-281, passing just to the south of Seward along the way. In a September 25, 1946 resolution, the turn to the north at Radium Road was eliminated and K-19 was realigned to continue eastward to its current eastern terminus.

Major junctions

K-19 Spur

K-19 Spur is a  spur route of K-19. K-19 Spur begins at an intersection with K-19, just south of where it crosses the Arkansas River, and travels northward to US-56 in Larned. 2017 AADT on K-19 Spur was 2650 vehicles per day. The section of K-19 Spur within Larned is maintained by the city.

Major junctions

See also

 List of state highways in Kansas
 List of state highway spurs in Kansas

References

External links

 Kansas Department of Transportation State Map
 KDOT: Historic State Maps

019
Transportation in Edwards County, Kansas
Transportation in Pawnee County, Kansas
Transportation in Stafford County, Kansas